WFLM (104.5 FM) is a radio station broadcasting an urban adult contemporary format. Licensed to White City, Florida, United States, the station serves the Treasure Coast, FL area. The station is owned by Midway Broadcasting Company. On August 27, 2013, the station applied for a frequency change from 104.7 to 104.5 MHz and an upgrade from C3 at 17.5 kW to C2 at 50 kW. The license for this change was issued on February 17, 2016.

References

External links
WFLM Official Website

 

FLM
Radio stations established in 1994
1994 establishments in Florida
Urban adult contemporary radio stations in the United States